Building Big is a book written by David Macaulay, author of the book series The Way Things Work. The book details the design of about 25 famous structures, broken down into five categories: Bridges, Tunnels, Dams, Domes, and Skyscrapers. The buildings cover construction from Roman times to the modern era.

PBS has created a television series based on the book.

External links
Website of Building Big

2000 non-fiction books
Architecture books